Wabash Combination Depot-Moravia, now known as the Wabash Depot Museum, is an historic train station located in Moravia, Iowa, United States. It is believed to be one of the two standard-plan wooden Wabash combination freight and passenger depots that remain in Iowa. Completed in 1903, it served the Wabash Railroad. The Queen Anne style building is an example of the rural combination station plan.  The plan combined all railroad services from passengers to freight in one building.  The museum features railroad artifacts, an operational model train layout and a restored railroad section car. The building was listed on the National Register of Historic Places in 1999 as a part of the Advent & Development of Railroads in Iowa MPS.

References

External links
 Museum information

Railway stations in the United States opened in 1903
Railroad museums in Iowa
Former Wabash Railroad stations
Queen Anne architecture in Iowa
Transportation buildings and structures in Appanoose County, Iowa
National Register of Historic Places in Appanoose County, Iowa
Railway stations on the National Register of Historic Places in Iowa
Museums in Appanoose County, Iowa
Former railway stations in Iowa